Massala  is a genus of moths in the family Erebidae. The genus was erected by Francis Walker in 1865.

Species
Massala abdara (Herrich-Schäffer, [1869]) Venezuela
Massala asema Hampson, 1926 Antilles
Massala carthia Schaus, 1904 southeast Brazil
Massala dimidiata Walker, 1865 Jamaica
Massala dorsilinea (Dyar, 1909) Guyana
Massala ernestina Dognin, 1912 Bolivia
Massala hieroglyphica (Walker, 1867) Colombia
Massala maculifera (Maassen, 1890) Peru
Massala marmona Schaus, 1904 Brazil (São Paulo)
Massala obvertens (Walker, 1858) Puerto Rico, Dominican Republic, Guatemala

References

Eulepidotinae
Moth genera